Stone Lake is an unincorporated census-designated place in Sawyer and Washburn counties, Wisconsin, United States. The Sawyer County portion of the community is located in the town of Sand Lake, while the Washburn County portion is located in the town of Stone Lake. As of the 2010 census, its population is 178.

References

Census-designated places in Sawyer County, Wisconsin
Census-designated places in Washburn County, Wisconsin
Census-designated places in Wisconsin